Nicholas Drazenovic (born January 14, 1987) is a Canadian former professional ice hockey centre of Croatian ancestry. He most recently played with the San Antonio Rampage of the American Hockey League (AHL). Drazenovic was selected by the St. Louis Blues in the 6th round (171st overall) of the 2005 NHL Entry Draft.

Playing career
During the 2010–11 season, in November the Blues recalled Drazenovic from the AHL affiliate, the Peoria Rivermen. He played in three NHL games before being returned to Peoria for the remainder of the year.

On July 7, 2011, after he was not tendered an offer by the Blues, Drazenovic signed a one-year contract with the Columbus Blue Jackets. He was assigned to play with affiliate the Springfield Falcons for the start of the 2011–12 season.

On July 5, 2013, Drazenovic signed a one-year, two-way contract with the Pittsburgh Penguins that will pay him $550,000 at the NHL level. He was assigned to begin the 2013–14 season in the AHL with affiliate, the Wilkes-Barre/Scranton Penguins. On January 14, 2014, Drazenovic was recalled and played a solitary game with Pittsburgh in a 4-3 victory over the Washington Capitals the following day. He was promptly returned to the AHL, where he finished the season with 13 goals and 42 points in 63 games.

Drazenovic was re-signed by the Penguins to a one-year deal on July 1, 2014. Hampered by injury, Drazenovic was unable to improve upon his previous season with the Penguins, featuring in only 25 games for the 2014–15 season in Wilkes-Barre, however was still able to contribute offensively with 19 points.

As an un-signed free agent over the summer, Drazenovic belatedly returned to professional hockey in the 2015–16 season, signing a professional try-out contract in the AHL with the San Antonio Rampage on December 21, 2015. He made his debut with the Rampage that day in a 2-1 victory over the Iowa Wild. After a month with the depleted Rampage, Drazenovic secured an AHL contract as he was signed for the remainder of the campaign on January 26, 2015.

Career statistics

Regular season and playoffs

International

References

External links

1987 births
Living people
Canadian ice hockey centres
Canadian people of Croatian descent
Columbus Blue Jackets players
Ice hockey people from British Columbia
Sportspeople from Prince George, British Columbia
Peoria Rivermen (AHL) players
Pittsburgh Penguins players
St. Louis Blues draft picks
St. Louis Blues players
San Antonio Rampage players
Springfield Falcons players
Wilkes-Barre/Scranton Penguins players